Olivier Magnan-Grenier (born May 1, 1986) is a Canadian former professional ice hockey defenceman who played in the National Hockey League (NHL) with the New Jersey Devils.

Playing career
Magnan was born in Sherbrooke, Quebec. As a youth, he played in the 1999 and 2000 Quebec International Pee-Wee Hockey Tournaments with a minor ice hockey team from Sherbrooke. He was drafted by the New Jersey Devils in the 5th Round (148th overall) of the 2006 NHL Entry Draft, and played 18 National Hockey League games in the 2010–11 season with the Devils.

On July 10, 2012, Magnan joined newly promoted Austrian club, Dornbirner EC, from his first European club abroad in Italy with HC Pustertal Wölfe.

On September 1, 2020, having played eight seasons with Dornbirn and captaining the club, Magnan opted to return by agreeing to a one-year contract extension with the Bulldogs.

Following his ninth season with Dornbirn, and his third as captain in 2020–21, Magnan announced his retirement from professional hockey after 15 years on July 9, 2021.

Career statistics

References

External links

1986 births
Living people
Albany Devils players
Canadian ice hockey defencemen
Dornbirn Bulldogs players
French Quebecers
Sportspeople from Sherbrooke
Lowell Devils players
New Jersey Devils draft picks
New Jersey Devils players
HC Pustertal Wölfe players
Rouyn-Noranda Huskies players
Trenton Titans players
Val-d'Or Foreurs players
Ice hockey people from Quebec
Canadian expatriate ice hockey players in Austria
Canadian expatriate ice hockey players in Italy